Lot Fourteen is a business and technology precinct at the eastern end of North Terrace in Adelaide city centre, South Australia. The  site formerly accommodated the old Royal Adelaide Hospital, which was moved to a new building at the western end of North Terrace in 2017. Its name was derived from the original 1837 plan for Adelaide by surveyor-general Colonel William Light. By 2020, refurbished hospital buildings were home to a large number of tenants, and further new buildings and public spaces are planned, scheduled for completion around 2025. The redevelopment of the site has been led by the Department of the Premier and Cabinet.

The Aboriginal Art and Cultures Centre (AACC), also known as Tarrkarri, a new Aboriginal cultural centre and gallery planned for completion in 2024/5, will be the centrepiece of the development. This will exhibit a large number of cultural artefacts currently in storage in the South Australian Museum as well as artefacts and works of art sourced elsewhere.

An entrepreneurial hub known as FIXE@LotFourteen (Future Industries Exchange for Entrepreneurship at Lot Fourteen) is being developed. A new 16-storey building will house the Entrepreneurial and Innovation Centre.

There are a number of technology-focused enterprises at Lot Fourteen. The headquarters of the Australian Space Agency, a Commonwealth government department, are located in the McEwin Building, along with SmartSat CRC and other space-related companies. The Australian Cyber Collaboration Centre (A3C) is housed in the Eleanor Harrald Building (former nurses' quarters), along with other technology businesses such as Inovor Technologies (space technology) and Presagen (health technology). The Australian Institute for Machine Learning, an artificial intelligence research institute created collaboratively by the state government and the University of Adelaide, is located in the south-western corner of the precinct. The Stone & Chalk start-up hub, in the old Allied Health Building, houses the MIT's bigdata Living Lab, along with 45 other technology-focused enterprises.

An International Centre for Food, Hospitality and Tourism Studies is also being planned for the site.

Background
The old Royal Adelaide Hospital, situated at the eastern end of North Terrace, with some of its buildings dating back to the 19th century, was moved into a new complex at the western end of North Terrace in September 2017. Plans for the redevelopment of the  site commenced well before the move. The  site is in within the cultural precinct of the city, next to the Adelaide Botanic Garden and with the University of Adelaide, University of South Australia,  Adelaide Botanic High School and the Art Gallery of South Australia as close neighbours. A mixed development, incorporating cultural institutions as well as residential, hotel and office uses is planned for the site. Federal funds have been injected into the project, under an agreement known as the "Adelaide City Deal".

The name "Lot Fourteen" is derived from the original 1837 plan for Adelaide by surveyor-general Colonel William Light.

Responsibility for the redevelopment is led by the Department of the Premier and Cabinet, working in collaboration with the Department for Innovation and Skills, Defence SA, Department for Trade and Investment, Department of Treasury and Finance, the urban renewal arm of the South Australian Government, Renewal SA and the Chief Entrepreneur.

History tours were available to appreciate the heritage value of the site.

Timeline

2017
Before the new RAH building was complete, various ideas were mooted about uses for the site of the old buildings. In January 2017, the then South Australian Government had plans to redevelop the site which included more than 1,000 apartments and a five-star hotel. It was decided that five heritage buildings would be retained, and about a third of the site would become part of the adjoining Adelaide Botanic Garden. There were also plans to turn the helipad into a "roof-top hotel".

2018
In March 2018, there was a change of government, with Steven Marshall's Liberal Party voted into office. With the focus on its development as an "innovation hub", the state budget in September allocated  over five years to government authority Renewal SA to help lure startups and industries associated with the Australian Space Agency, which would be located on the site. Industry and Skills minister David Pisoni said the site would host up to 650 workspaces, conference and collaboration facilities. Several of the heritage buildings would be maintained and redeveloped.

By the end of 2018, over 150 people had moved into the development, in the focus areas of artificial intelligence and machine learning, data analytics, cybersecurity, defence and space technology, and creative technology. An entrepreneurial hub known as FIXE@LotFourteen (Future Industries Exchange for Entrepreneurship at Lot Fourteen) had also been established.

On 12 December 2018, Prime Minister Scott Morrison officially announced that the Australian Space Agency, a department of the federal government, would be located at Lot Fourteen in 2019.

2019
In June 2019, Adelaide City Council raised concerns about the proposed exemption from paying rates by businesses on the site, after RenewalSA had announced plans for a proposed 250-room hotel at the site. By that time, there were a number of space-related companies already there or signed on, and plans for the Gallery for Aboriginal Art and Cultures, an International Centre for Food, Hospitality and Tourism Studies and an Indigenous Business Hub were being consolidated. The state government would be implementing a new governance arrangement for Lot Fourteen.

Canadian expert Ilse Treurnicht, formerly CEO of the MaRS Discovery District in Toronto, a not-for-profit innovation complex built on the site of an old hospital, was invited to submit recommendations to the government in September 2019, during a second visit arranged by the Don Dunstan Foundation. Among her recommendations was that the non-government sector should have a greater say in the management of the redevelopment. She also recommended establishing an independent board, which could consult widely and create cross-sector collaborations between government and business groups.

Tenants of the refurbished Hanson and Eleanor Harrald Buildings included Inovor Technologies (space technology) and Presagen (health technology) in June 2019, with a forecast of over a thousand people working there by the end of the summer season in 2020. Also in June, the independent not-for-profit innovation hub operator Stone & Chalk was commissioned to help start-ups at the site develop and grow and to provide advice to the government. They said that FIXE at Lot Fourteen would be launched by October. Grants, education, workspaces and other forms of support are designed to attract entrepreneurs to the site.

In July 2019, the Massachusetts Institute of Technology (MIT) agreed to collaborate on the development of a "Living Lab", enabling collaboration among the public, private and research sectors to determine the best ways for South Australia to plan both economic and sustainable population growth.

2020
The Australian Space Agency offices were officially opened on 19 February 2020 in the McEwin Building. The ASA is planning to "triple the size of the Australian space industry and create 20,000 new jobs by 2030".

Also in February, Marshall (Premier and Minister of the Arts and Aboriginal Affairs) announced that the  million Aboriginal Cultural Centre would open by 2023, after long consultation with Indigenous communities, especially the local Kaurna people, resulting in improvements on the original plan. The South Australian Museum’s collection of over 30,000  cultural artefacts, currently in storage, would form the centrepiece of the collection on public display, and it would also include artefacts and other forms of art sourced from not only within SA (including from Tandanya and the Art Gallery of South Australia), but also from around Australia, making it the most "comprehensive collection of Australian Aboriginal cultural material in the world". The project was to be funded by the state government to the tune of  million, and federal government by  million. The word “national” had been dropped from the title of the new institution, from its title owing to competition with the Northern Territory, with both jurisdictions claiming their institutions would be firsts for Australia.

The Australian Cyber Collaboration Centre (A3C) was established in the Eleanor Harrald Building in July.

In September 2020, Ireland-based professional services company Accenture announced that they would be establishing in hub in Adelaide, with premises at Lot Fourteen.

It is intended to use virtual reality and other digital technologies, and to create spaces for performances which would cater for "immersive interactive story-telling". Construction is scheduled to commence in 2021, with completion in 2024.

 of the Adelaide City Deal is earmarked for developing the International Centre for Food, Hospitality and Tourism Studies, with construction starting in 2021. A new 16-storey building will house the Entrepreneurial and Innovation and Centre, scheduled for completion at the end of 2023.The Australian Institute for Machine Learning (AML) is located on the corner of North Terrace and Frome Road, an artificial intelligence research institute created collaboratively by the state government and the University of Adelaide.

The Stone & Chalk startup hub, housed in the old Allied Health Building, provides office space to 45 technology-focused enterprises, and also the MIT's bigdata Living Lab.

2021
In January, the Adelaide office of architectural firm Woods Bagot was commissioned to create the preliminary designs for the AACC.

During an outbreak of COVID-19 in Adelaide in July 2021, during the COVID-19 pandemic, SA Health opened a temporary COVID-19 testing centre on the site.

In December 2021, construction began on the Aboriginal Arts and Cultures Centre, which was assigned the name Tarrkarri, meaning "the future" in the Kaurna language. Kaurna ambassador for the centre, David Rathman, said that the  build would provide jobs for local Aboriginal people, and that Aboriginal people would be consulted at all stages of the design and construction process.

2022

In September 2022, it was announced that Airbus Defence and Space would be setting up a research facility at Lot Fourteen in October, responsible for developing new satellites for the Australian Defence Force. The company will work on the Defence Department's "Resilient Multi-mission Space STaR Shot" (RMS) program, which includes the development and launching of at least four satellites over the following eight years.

Heritage buildings

The Sheridan Kiosk was built in 1925 as a food kiosk to serve the hospital, named to honour early settlers John and Frances Keith Sheridan. BB Architects' restoration of the building put it in the running for both the City of Adelaide architectural prize and the David Saunders Award for Heritage Architecture in 2021.

The Hanson and Eleanor Harrald Buildings included Inovor Technologies (space technology) and Presagen (health technology) in June 2019, with a forecast of over a thousand people working there by the end of the summer season in 2020.

The Bice Building, McEwin Building, Women's Health centre and the Margaret Graham building were also renovated. Some parts are being used by the nearby University of Adelaide. The other buildings were/are being demolished.

Sculpture

The work was commissioned by Lot Fourteen, and is located in front of the Australian Space Discovery Centre.

See also 

 Innovation Collaboration Centre
 South Australian Space Industry Centre
 ThincLab

References

External links

Redevelopment projects in Australia
Geography of Adelaide
Museums in Adelaide